The Arabic periodical al-Ǧāmiʿa (meaning “community" in English) was founded in 1899 and initially published in Alexandria by Faraḥ Anṭūn (1874–1922), an Egyptian intellectual. The desk then moved to New York in 1906 and to Cairo in 1909. Between 1899 and 1910, 77 issues were published in seven years; the first 12 issues bore the title "al-Ǧāmiʿa al-ʿuṯmānīya". Several issues were published as double-editions or comprised consecutive supplements. While making the digitalized periodical accessible in the digital collections of the Bonn University Library, this peculiarity was taken into account and indicated for reference. The published articles dealt with political, cultural, and historical topics while emphasizing education as well as the role of women and the family.

References

Further reading
 Ahmed-Bioud, Abdelghani et al. (1969).: 3200 revues et journaux arabes de 1800 à 1965, titres arabes et titres translittérés, Paris.
 Ayalon, Ami (1995): The Press in the Arab Middle East, New York.
 Glaß, Dagmar (2004): Der al-Muqtaṭaf und seine Öffentlichkeit. Aufklärung, Räsonnement und Meinungsstreit in der frühen arabischen Zeitschriftenkommunikation, Würzburg.
 Herzog, Christoph et al. (1995): Presse und Öffentlichkeit im Nahen Osten, Heidelberg.
 Morsy, Hassan (1963): Die ägyptische Presse. Struktur und Entwicklung der ägyptischen Presse der Gegenwart, Hannover.
 Shafik, Fouad Fahmi (1982): The Press and Politics of Modern Egypt, 1798–1970, New York.
 Ṭarrāzī, Fīlīb dī (1913/14): Tārīḫ aṣ-ṣiḥāfa al-ʿarabīya, Beirut.

External links
 al-Ǧāmiʿa, digitized online version

Arab-American culture in New York City
Arabic-language magazines
Biweekly magazines published in Egypt
Cultural magazines
Defunct political magazines published in Egypt
Defunct political magazines published in the United States
Egyptian-American culture in New York City
Magazines disestablished in 1910
Magazines established in 1899
Magazines published in Cairo
Magazines published in New York City
Mass media in Alexandria
Monthly magazines published in Egypt